Clunas is a surname. Notable people with the surname include:

 Charles Clunas (1894–1916), Scottish footballer
 Craig Clunas (born 1954), Scottish art historian
 Gordon Clunas, Australian rugby player
 William Clunas (1899–1967), Scottish footballer